Annette Ducharme, also known as Anet (born February 23 in Windsor, Ontario) is a Canadian musician and songwriter. She is best known as a songwriter for other performers, including Tom Cochrane and Lawrence Gowan, but has also recorded several albums, both as a solo artist and as a member of the band Bowers-Ducharme (with James Bowers).

Ducharme is also known for her song "Start Again," co-written with Darren Radtke. It is known among television viewers worldwide as the theme song of the CBC Television teen soap opera Edgemont.

Ducharme, a Franco-Ontarian, was born in Windsor, Ontario.

Discography
Blue Girl (1989)
Sanctuary (1994)
Don't Argue with Her (1996)
Tortured (1997)
Talented Girl (2003)
Wreck•Age (2019)

Filmography

Composer
 Tall Tale Heart (2004)
 Rapid Fire (2006)

References

External links
 Official Website
 

Year of birth missing (living people)
Living people
Franco-Ontarian people
Canadian women singer-songwriters
Canadian women rock singers
Musicians from Windsor, Ontario
20th-century Canadian women singers
21st-century Canadian women singers